José Luis García Cobos (January 18, 1924 – October 14, 2015) was a Mexican baseball outfielder and manager. García was dubbed 'Chito', a moniker that he proudly used throughout his life.

García was born in the port of Veracruz, where he earned a degree in naval engineering. Since an early age he was devoted to baseball and football fields, reaching professional status in both sports.

Baseball
García debuted in 1953 in the Mexican League, playing at left field for the Rojos del Águila de Veracruz before joining the Diablos Rojos del Mexico from 1964 to 1965. Although his leading role in baseball was as a manager, amassing a record of 1385–1436 (.491) in a span of 20 seasons between 1963 and 1984.

His most significant highlight came in 1965, when he led the Tigres de Quintana Roo to the Mexican League championship, guiding a roster comprised only by Mexican ballplayers. In addition, García managed the Mexican national baseball squad in the 1990 Baseball World Cup.

Football
In between, he was a member of the Tiburones Rojos de Veracruz football club that won the 1945–1946 Liga MX Primera División tournament.

Death
García died in 2015 in Mexico City, Mexico, at the age of 91. No cause of death was given.

Sources

1924 births
2015 deaths
People from Veracruz (city)
Footballers from Veracruz
Mexican baseball players
Rojos del Águila de Veracruz players
Diablos Rojos del México players
Fresnillo baseball players
Mexican League baseball managers
Minor league baseball managers
Mexican footballers
C.D. Veracruz footballers
Association footballers not categorized by position